This article lists inventions and discoveries made by scientists with Pakistani nationality within Pakistan and outside the country, as well as those made in the territorial area of what is now Pakistan prior to the independence of Pakistan in 1947.

Bronze Age

Indus Valley civilisation

Proto-writing:Indus script was a  Bronze Age script developed along Indus river, in modern day's Pakistan.  
 Button, ornamental: Buttons—made from seashell—were used in the Indus Valley civilization for ornamental purposes by 2000 BCE. Some buttons were carved into geometric shapes and had holes pieced into them so that they could attached to clothing by using a thread. Ian McNeil (1990) holds that: "The button, in fact, was originally used more as an ornament than as a fastening, the earliest known being found at Mohenjo-daro in the Indus Valley. It is made of a curved shell and about 5000 years old."
 Plough, animal-drawn: The earliest archeological evidence of an animal-drawn plough dates back to 2500 BCE in the Indus Valley Civilization in Pakistan.
 Stepwell: Earliest clear evidence of the origins of the stepwell is found in the Indus Valley Civilization's archaeological site at Mohenjodaro in Pakistan. The three features of stepwells in the subcontinent are evident from one particular site, abandoned by 2500 BCE, which combines a bathing pool, steps leading down to water, and figures of some religious importance into one structure. The early centuries immediately before the common era saw the Buddhists and the Jains of India adapt the stepwells into their architecture. Both the wells and the form of ritual bathing reached other parts of the world with Buddhism. Rock-cut step wells in the subcontinent date from 200 to 400 CE. Subsequently, the wells at Dhank (550-625 CE) and stepped ponds at Bhinmal (850-950 CE) were constructed.
Bow Drill: Bow drills were used in Mehrgarh between the 4th and 5th millennium BC. This bow drill—used to drill holes into lapis lazuli and carnelian—was made of green jasper. Similar drills were found in other parts of the Indus Valley civilisation and Iran one millennium later. 

Public Baths: The earliest public baths are found in the ruins in of the Indus Valley civilisation. According to John Keay, the "Great Bath" of Mohenjo Daro in present-day Pakistan was the size of 'a modest municipal swimming pool', complete with stairs leading down to the water at each one of its ends.
Grid Plan: By 2600 BC, Mohenjo-daro and Harappa, and other major cities of the Indus Valley civilisation, were built with blocks divided by a grid of straight streets, running north–south and east–west. Each block was subdivided by small lanes.
Gemstones and Lapis Lazuli – Lapis lazuli artifacts, dated to 7570 BCE, have been found at Bhirrana, which is the oldest site of Indus Valley civilisation.
Flush Toilet: Mohenjo-Daro circa 2800 BC is cited as having some of the most advanced, with toilets built into outer walls of homes. These toilets were Western-style, albeit a primitive form, with vertical chutes, via which waste was disposed of into cesspits or street drains.
Drainage System: The Indus Valley civilisation had advanced sewerage and drainage systems. All houses in the major cities of Harappa and Mohenjo-daro had access to water and drainage facilities. Waste water was directed to covered gravity sewers, which lined the major streets.
Tanning (leather):Tanning was being carried out by the inhabitants of Mehrgarh in Pakistan between 7000 and 3300 BCE.

Ancient Age

Concept of Zero:A symbol for zero, a large dot likely to be the precursor of the still-current hollow symbol, is used throughout the Bakhshali manuscript, a practical manual on arithmetic for merchants, discovered in Northern Pakistan. In 2017, three samples from the manuscript were shown by radiocarbon dating to come from three different centuries: from AD 224–383, AD 680–779, and AD 885–993, making it South Asia's oldest recorded use of the zero symbol. It is not known how the birch bark fragments from different centuries forming the manuscript came to be packaged together.
Kharosthi numerals:They were developed in what is now Northern Pakistan in 2nd century BCE, later evolving into Hindu–Arabic numeral system. It later gave rise to modern Arabic Numerals.
Formal grammar: In his treatise Astadhyayi, Panini gives formal production rules and definitions to describe the formal grammar of Sanskrit. 
Morphological analysis: Panini, who lived during 5th century BCE in Gandhara developed methods of morphological analysis. Pāṇini's theory of morphological analysis was more advanced than any equivalent Western theory before the 20th century.
Early Universities: Pakistan was the seat of ancient learning and some consider Taxila to be an early university   or centre of higher education, others do not consider it a university in the modern sense   in contrast to the later Nalanda University.  Takshashila is described in some detail in later Jātaka tales, written in Sri Lanka around the 5th century CE. Generally, a student entered Taxila at the age of sixteen. The Vedas and the Eighteen Arts, which included skills such as archery, hunting, and elephant lore, were taught, in addition to its law school, medical school, and school of military science.

Medieval Age
Windpumps: Windpumps were used to pump water since at least the 9th century in what are now Pakistan and Iran, making its one of the earliest mentioned use.

Post-independence

Chemistry 
 Development of the world's first workable plastic magnet at room temperature by organic chemist and polymer scientist Naveed Zaidi.

Physics 

 Discovery of electroweak interaction by Abdus Salam, along with two Americans Sheldon Glashow and Steven Weinberg. The discovery led them to receive the Nobel Prize in Physics.
Abdus Salam who along with Steven Weinberg independently predicted the existence of a subatomic particle now called the Higgs boson, Named after a British physicist who theorized that it endowed other particles with mass.
The development of the Standard Model of particle physics by Sheldon Glashow's discovery in 1960 of a way to combine the electromagnetic and weak interactions.  In 1967 Steven Weinberg and Abdus Salam incorporated the Higgs mechanism into Glashow's electroweak theory, giving it its modern form.

Medicine 

 The Ommaya reservoir - a system for the delivery of drugs (e.g. chemotherapy) into the cerebrospinal fluid for treatment of patients with brain tumours - was developed by Ayub K. Ommaya, a Pakistani neurosurgeon.
A non-invasive technology for monitoring intracranial pressure (ICP) - developed by Faisal Kashif.

Computing 

 A boot sector computer virus dubbed (c)Brain, one of the first computer viruses in history, was created in 1986 by the Farooq Alvi Brothers in Lahore, Pakistan, reportedly to deter unauthorized copying of the software they had written.
 Neurochip by Pakistani-Canadian inventor Naweed Syed.

Music 
 The Sagar veena, a string instrument designed for use in classical music, was developed entirely in Pakistan over the last 40 years at the Sanjannagar Institute in Lahore by Raza Kazim.

Economics 

 The Human Development Index was devised by Pakistani economist Mahbub ul Haq in 1990 and had the explicit purpose "to shift the focus of development economics from national income accounting to people centered policies".

See also 
 :Category:Pakistani inventors
 Science and technology in Pakistan
 List of inventions and discoveries of the Indus Valley Civilization covers the Bronze Age culture that flourished from 3300 to 1300 BCE in what is now Pakistan
 List of Indian inventions and discoveries covers inventions made in the Indian subcontinent between the decline of the IVC and the formation of Pakistan

References

External links
 applications: Can we invent more than herbal crack cream?, The Express Tribune

 
Lists of inventions or discoveries
Inventions
Inventions and discoveries